Ivan Belák  (born 23 January 1978 in Handlová) is a Slovak footballer (midfielder) who currently plays for the Slovak 6. liga club FC Baník Horná Nitra. He previously played for 1. FC Tatran Prešov in the Slovak Corgoň Liga.

International career
Belák has been capped twice for the Slovakia national football team.

References

 
 

1978 births
Living people
People from Handlová
Sportspeople from the Trenčín Region
Slovak footballers
Association football midfielders
Slovakia international footballers
MŠK Púchov players
MŠK Žilina players
FK Senica players
1. FC Tatran Prešov players
Slovak Super Liga players
FC Baník Prievidza players